The Bayer designation Phi Ceti (φ Cet / φ Ceti) is shared by four stars, in the constellation Cetus:
φ1 Ceti (HR 194), a red clump giant
φ2 Ceti (HR 235), an F7  main sequence star
φ3 Ceti (HR 267), a red giant
φ4 Ceti (HR 279), a G8 giant

All of them were the Arabs' Al Nithām. According to the catalogue of stars in the Technical Memorandum 33-507 - A Reduced Star Catalog Containing 537 Named Stars, Al Nitham were the title for four stars :φ1 Ceti as Al Nitham I, φ2 Ceti as Al Nitham II, φ3 Ceti as Al Nitham III and φ4 Ceti as Al Nitham IV. 

φ1 Ceti and φ3 Ceti were member of asterism 天溷 (Tiān Hùn), Celestial Pigsty, Legs mansion.

References

Ceti, Phi
Cetus (constellation)